Elections were held in the organized municipalities in the Thunder Bay District of Ontario on October 24, 2022 in conjunction with municipal elections across the province.

The following are the results of the mayoral races in each municipality and the council races in the City of Thunder Bay.

Conmee

Mayor

Town Council (4 to be elected)

Dorion

Reeve

Town Council (4 to be elected)

Gillies

Reeve

Town Council (4 to be elected)

Greenstone
The following were the results for mayor and council of Greenstone.

Mayor
Incumbent Renald Beaulieu did not run for re-election. Longlac Ward councillor James McPherson was elected mayor by acclamation.

Municipal Council

Manitouwadge
The following were the results for mayor of Manitouwadge.

Mayor

Town Council (4 to be elected)

Marathon

Mayor
Rick Dumas was re-elected by acclamation to a third term as mayor of Marathon.

Town Council (4 to be elected)

Total Electors was 1044, with their choice of four candidates.

Neebing
The following were the results for mayor and council of Neebing.

Mayor

Municipal Council

Nipigon
The following were the results for mayor of Nipigon.

Mayor

Town Council (4 to be elected)

O'Connor

Mayor

Town Council (4 to be elected)

Oliver Paipoonge

Mayor
The following were the results for mayor of Oliver Paipoonge. Municipal councillors Brandon Postuma and Rick Potter ran against incumbent mayor Lucy Kloosterhuis.

Municipal Council (4 to be elected)

Red Rock

Mayor
Darquise Robinson was re-elected mayor of Red Rock by acclamation.

Town Council (4 to be elected)

Schreiber

Mayor
The following were the results for mayor of Schreiber.

Town Council (4 to be elected)

Shuniah

Mayor

Town Council

Terrace Bay

Mayor
The following were the results for mayor of Terrace Bay.

Town Council (4 to be elected)

Thunder Bay
The following were the results for mayor and city council of Thunder Bay.

Mayor
In the race for mayor in 2022 in Thunder Bay were former two-time mayor and Liberal MP Ken Boshcoff, former Thunder Bay Chronicle-Journal publisher Clint Harris, at-large city councillor Peng You, entrepreneur Gary Mack and Lakehead University radio host Robert Szczepanski.

City Council

Incumbents not running for re-election

English Public School Board Elections

English Catholic School Board Elections

French Public School Board Elections

French Catholic School Board Elections

References 

Thunder Bay
Thunder Bay District